Mohawk is an unincorporated community in western Greene County, eastern Tennessee, United States, located  west of the town of Greeneville. Its post office has the zip code 37810.

The community is situated between two hills near the confluence of Riley and Lick creeks, just west of where the Norfolk Southern tracks cross a bridge over Lick Creek.  Mohawk Road connects the community to U.S. Route 11E (Andrew Johnson Highway) to the northeast and State Highway 348 (McDonald Road) to the southwest.

According to local tradition, Mohawk was originally known as "Lick Creek Siding," and later as "Pane."  The name was changed by residents to "Mohawk" after a group of Indians passed through the area during the Civil War.  By the 1940s, Mohawk had developed as a "fairly prosperous rural community." It had a roller mill, a car dealership, and a general store.

Education
Mohawk is home to McDonald Elementary School, a Greene County public school that includes Pre-kindergarten through Fifth Grade. Its namesake was Earnest McDonald, a wealthy bachelor who donated money to build the school. The original building was demolished in 1957, and replaced by the brick building in use today. McDonald High School was dissolved after the 1966–67 school year, when students were directed to a regional high school. This building was converted for use as an elementary school, however in 2019 the middle school building was converted to other purposes, re-directing middle schoolers to West Greene Middle School.

References

Unincorporated communities in Greene County, Tennessee
Unincorporated communities in Tennessee